Karolj is a Hungarian masculine given name.  Notable people referred to by this name include the following:

Given name
Karolj Kasap (born 1954), Serbian wrestler
Karolj Kopas (born 1958), Yugoslav wrestler

See also

Karol (name)
Karola
Karole
Karoli (disambiguation)
Károly
Karolju

Notes

Hungarian masculine given names